Doña Ana County is located in the southern part of the State of New Mexico, United States. As of the 2020 U.S. Census, its population was 219,561, which makes it the second-most populated county in New Mexico. Its county seat is Las Cruces, the second-most populous municipality in New Mexico after Albuquerque, with 111,385 as of the 2020 U.S. Census.

The county is named for Doña Ana Robledo, who died there in 1680 while fleeing the Pueblo Revolt. Doña Ana County is one of only two counties in the United States to have a diacritical mark in its name, the other being Coös County, New Hampshire. Notably, both Doña Ana County and Coös County lie on short international borders, the former with Mexico and the latter with Canada.

Doña Ana County consists of the Las Cruces, NM Metropolitan Statistical Area, which is also included in the El Paso–Las Cruces, TX–NM Combined Statistical Area.
It borders Luna, Sierra, and Otero counties in New Mexico, and El Paso County, Texas to the east and southeast.

The state of Chihuahua, Mexico borders the county to the south. Construction of an improved barrier on the border was expedited in 2019 with waivers of environmental and other laws. The waivers are for 27 laws including protection of endangered species, archaeological sites, and historic places.

Being 67.3% Hispanic in 2020, Doña Ana is New Mexico's largest majority-Hispanic county.

Geography

The county contains a number of prominent geographical features, most notably the Mesilla Valley (the flood plain of the Rio Grande) going north to south through the center and the Organ Mountains along the county's eastern edge. Other mountain ranges in the county are the Robledo Mountains, Doña Ana Mountains, Sierra de las Uvas, the southern end of the San Andres Mountains, East Potrillo Mountains, and West Potrillo Mountains, as well as two small, isolated mountains, Tortugas (or A) Mountain on the east and Picacho Peak on the west side of Las Cruces. The county also includes one of New Mexico's four large lava fields, the Aden Malpais, and one of the world's largest maare volcanoes, Kilbourne Hole.

Adjacent counties and municipios
 Luna County – west
 Sierra County – north
 Otero County – east
 El Paso County, Texas – southeast
 Ascensión, Chihuahua, Mexico – south
 Juárez, Chihuahua, Mexico – south

National protected areas
 El Camino Real de Tierra Adentro National Historic Trail (part)
 Prehistoric Trackways National Monument
 San Andres National Wildlife Refuge
 White Sands National Park (part)

Demographics

2010 U.S. Census
As of the 2010 United States Census, there were 209,233 people, 75,532 households, and 51,863 families residing in the county. The racial makeup of the county was 74.1% white, 1.7% black or African American, 1.5% American Indian, 1.1% Asian, 0.1% Pacific islander, 18.5% from other races, and 3.0% from two or more races. Those of Hispanic or Latino origin made up 65.7% of the population. In terms of ancestry, 7.3% were German, and 2.2% were American.

Of the 75,532 households, 37.4% had children under the age of 18 living with them, 46.8% were married couples living together, 16.0% had a female householder with no husband present, 31.3% were non-families, and 24.2% of all households were made up of individuals. The average household size was 2.71 and the average family size was 3.25. The median age was 32.4 years.

The median income for a household in the county was $36,657 and the median income for a family was $43,184. Males had a median income of $33,510 versus $25,217 for females. The per capita income for the county was $18,315. About 20.1% of families and 24.5% of the population were below the poverty line, including 34.8% of those under age 18 and 13.6% of those age 65 or over.

2000 U.S. Census
As of the 2000 United States Census, there were 174,682 people, 59,556 households, and 42,939 families residing in the county. The population density was 46 people per square mile (18/km2). There were 65,210 housing units at an average density of 17 per square mile (7/km2). The racial makeup of the county was 67.8%  White, 1.6% Black or African American, 1.5% Native American, 0.8% Asian, 0.1% Pacific Islander, 24.7%  from other races, and 3.6% from two or more races. 63.4% of the population were Hispanic or Latino of any race.

There were 59,556 households, out of which 38.4%  had children under the age of 18 living with them, 52.4%  were married couples living together, 14.7%  had a female householder with no husband present, and 27.9%  were non-families. 21.3%  of all households were made up of individuals, and 6.9%  had someone living alone who was 65 years of age or older. The average household size was 2.85 and the average family size was 3.36.

In the county, the population was spread out, with 29.7%  under the age of 18, 13.3%  from 18 to 24, 27.1%  from 25 to 44, 19.3%  from 45 to 64, and 10.6%  who were 65 years of age or older. The median age was 30 years. For every 100 females there were 96.5 males. For every 100 females age 18 and over, there were 93.5 males.

The median income for a household in the county was $29,808, and the median income for a family was $33,576. Males had a median income of $27,215 versus $20,883 for females. The per capita income for the county was $13,999. 25.4%  of the population and 20.2%  of families were below the poverty line. Out of the total people living in poverty, 34.4%  are under the age of 18 and 12.7%  are 65 or older.

Politics
Doña Ana is a Democratic-leaning county in Presidential and Congressional elections. Since 1920, Doña Ana has voted for the candidate who also won statewide, the only exception being in 2004 when Democrat John Kerry won Doña Ana 51–48%, while Republican George W. Bush won statewide 50–49%. The last Republican to win a majority in the county was George H. W. Bush in 1988. In 2008, Democrat Barack Obama won 58% of the county's vote. In 2016, Republican Donald Trump won 35.9% of the county's vote, the lowest share for a Republican candidate since 1936.

Doña Ana is part of New Mexico's 2nd congressional district, which is held by Republican Stella Yvette Herrell. In the State Senate Doña Ana is part of the 31st, 36th, 37th, 38th, and 40th Senate districts, which are held by Democrats Joseph Cervantes, Jeff Steinborn, David Soules, Mary Kay Papen, and Republican Bill Burt, respectively. In the State House Doña Ana is part of the 33rd, 34th, 35th, and 52nd House districts, which are held by Democrats Bill McCamley, Bealquin Gomez, Angelica Rubio, and Joanne Ferrary, respectively, the 37th and 53rd House districts, which are held by Republican Ricky Little, respectively, and the 36th House district, which is held by Nathan Small. Current County Commissioners are as follows: Lynn Ellins (District 1), Ramon S. Gonzalez (District 2), Shannon Reynolds (District 3), Isabella Solis (District 4), and VACANT (District 5).

In January 2012, a Federal court awarded former County prisoner Stephen Slevin a $22 million award for inhumane treatment and for keeping him jailed for 2 years without a trial. In a radio interview on the Canadian Broadcasting Corporation program As It Happens broadcast February 7, 2012, Slevin's lawyer indicated that he was arrested for "DWI". During his incarceration, Slevin was placed in solitary confinement. When his health deteriorated, Slevin was removed to a hospital, but after two weeks in the hospital, he was returned to solitary confinement. The lawyer stated that pictures taken before and after Slevin's time in jail were key to the trial's outcome. The District Attorney for the 3rd Judicial District in Doña Ana County during the 2005 - 2007 indefinite detention without trial of Mr. Slevin was Susana Martinez, who later became the Governor of New Mexico.

In August 2013, County Clerk Lynn Ellins announced he would begin granting marriage licenses to same-sex couples. Ellins said in a statement explaining his decision:

Several Republican state legislators vowed to file suit against Ellins in a bid to halt the licenses from being issued.

Communities

Cities
 Anthony
 Las Cruces (county seat)
 Sunland Park

Towns
 Mesilla

Village
 Hatch

Census-designated places

 Berino
 Butterfield Park
 Chamberino
 Chaparral
 Doña Ana
 Fairacres
 Garfield
 La Mesa
 La Union
 Mesquite
 Organ
 Picacho Hills
 Placitas
 Radium Springs
 Rincon
 Rodey
 Salem
 San Miguel
 San Pablo
 San Ysidro
 Santa Teresa
 Tortugas
 University Park
 Vado
 White Sands

Other places
 Picacho

Ghost towns 
 Lanark
 Santa Barbara

Education
School districts in the county include:
 Gadsden Independent Schools
 Hatch Valley Municipal Schools
 Las Cruces Public Schools

See also
 National Register of Historic Places listings in Doña Ana County, New Mexico

References

External links

 
1852 establishments in New Mexico Territory
Populated places established in 1852
Hispanic and Latino American culture in New Mexico